Bearhat Mountain is located in the Lewis Range, Glacier National Park in the U.S. state of Montana. Bearhat Mountain is immediately west of Hidden Lake. The mountain was named after a Kootenai Native American, and was officially adopted by the U.S. Board on Geographic Names in 1932.

Based on the Köppen climate classification, Bearhat Mountain has an alpine climate characterized by long, usually very cold winters, and short, cool to mild summers. Temperatures can drop below −10 °F with wind chill factors below −30 °F.

Geology

Like other mountains in Glacier National Park, Bearhat Mountain is composed of sedimentary rock laid down during the Precambrian to Jurassic periods.

See also

 Geology of the Rocky Mountains
 Mountains and mountain ranges of Glacier National Park (U.S.)

Gallery

References

External links

 Bearhat Mountain: Weather

Mountains of Flathead County, Montana
Bearhat
Lewis Range
Mountains of Montana